Clarence Henry Winston (August 27, 1878 – September 15, 1952), nicknamed "Bobby", was an American baseball outfielder in the pre-Negro leagues.

Winston started playing baseball for the Reformers All Stars of Richmond, Virginia where he was also the captain and manager. In 1905 he signed with the Norfolk Red Stockings and in August of that year jumped the team to play for the Cuban X-Giants.

In 1907, Winston left the X-Giants for the Leland Giants, remaining with the team, and the cross-town team Chicago Giants until 1921.

References

External links
 and Baseball-Reference Black Baseball stats and Seamheads

Chicago Giants players
Cuban X-Giants players
Leland Giants players
Philadelphia Giants players
Baseball players from Virginia
1878 births
1952 deaths
People from Henrico County, Virginia